"King Kathy" is a song written, performed and produced by Barry Gibb. The song was included on Barry Gibb Fan Club. It was written in 1970 while he wrote other songs for his debut album The Kid's No Good. It was released in 1971 on Lyntone Records.

On this track, Barry sings and play guitar and was recorded around October 1971 in London along with "Summer Ends" and "I Can Bring Love". Like "I Can Bring Love" the song starts with a false start.

Track listing
 All tracks were written by Barry Gibb.

Personnel
 Barry Gibb — lead vocals, acoustic guitar

References

Barry Gibb songs
1971 songs
Songs written by Barry Gibb
British folk songs